Gateway Mall is a shopping mall located within the Araneta City in Cubao, Quezon City, Philippines. Owned and operated by the Araneta City, Inc. (ACI, Inc.), a subsidiary of the Araneta Group, the mall was completed in 2004 and has  of total floor area. The Gateway Mall also currently sits on the northern area of the Araneta City, located at the northern end of the historic Araneta Coliseum and attracts over 220,000 shoppers daily, due to its close proximity to transport terminals and train stations.

At present, the Gateway Mall is also currently undergoing an expansion project, known as the Gateway Mall 2, located along the western side of the Araneta Coliseum, and also includes the Ibis Styles Araneta City within the development.

History and Planning

The present Gateway Mall development was once known as the "Millenium Mall" project, a planned 7-storey mall located adjacent to the Araneta Coliseum in the early stages of planning of the Araneta Center Redevelopment Master Plan. The redevelopment plan also included the "Manhattan Mall", a  mixed use development consisting retail and residential components, which became the present Manhattan Gardens,  a 400-room business hotel, now known as the Novotel Manila Araneta City, and the "Manila Tower", a  planned mixed-use tower with communication facilities, as part of the Araneta Center Master Plan in the year 2000, and was established in 2002, under a ₱66.25 Billion ($1.25 Billion) budget. 

For the full commencement of the project, the Araneta Group tapped Felino Palafox of Palafox Associates and Sudhakar Thakurdesai of RTKL Associates as the main architects and urban planners of the project, along with the Deshazo Starek and Tang (now Deshazo Group), Jones Lang LaSalle Incorporated and Colliers International as main consultants of the master plan. The plans for the mall contains a large part of the Araneta City, spanning from the Araneta Center–Cubao Line 2 station, around the west side of the Smart Araneta Coliseum, up to the Farmer's Market and General McArthur Avenue, with connections to the adjacent Farmers Plaza. The master plan commenced with the construction of the Gateway Mall in 2002, and the Gateway Mall 2 in 2017. Within the next few years, an additional expansion plan was being laid out for the upcoming Gateway Mall 3, planned to be built along the Araneta City Cyberpark site.

Development
The Gateway Mall, along with the New Gateway (Gateway Mall 2), the Gateway Tower, the Gateway Office Building, the Araneta Coliseum, the Araneta Coliseum Parking Garage, the Novotel Manila Araneta City, and the Ibis Styles Hotel are situated within the Gateway Square complex, a  superblock within the Araneta City, offering retail, dining, leisure, lodging, and entertainment facilities. The complex is also set to have   of floor area, and a total of 3,000 parking spaces upon completion, and is connected to other buildings and developments via sky bridges and walk paths.

Gateway Mall

Planning, Construction, and Development
Dubbed "Like No Other Mall in the World", the ₱2.5 Billion,  shopping complex was originally occupied by the Aurora Shopping Arcade, which became the Gateway-LRT 2 concourse, the Quezon Arcade and Plaza Fair, one of the main department stores in the area, until the building was demolished within 2001. The mall became the first property to break ground under the Araneta Center Redevelopment Plan, in which the project broke ground and commenced construction in October 2002 before the mall opened in October 2004, tapping CE Construction Corporation as the project's general contractor. However, the mall encountered construction and funding issues with its contractor, and the Araneta Group was forced to pay ₱114 million for the issues caused by the mall's construction. The mall was also a part of the Metro Centro Project of then Quezon City Mayor Feliciano Belmonte Jr. aimed to transform Quezon City into a modern and competitive city in the country.
 The mall's owner, Jorge L. Araneta, hired Sudhakar Thakurdesai of RTKL Associates as the main architect of the project, and Ralph Peter Jentes of Hyatt International Hotels for the hotel-standard services being offered in the mall. The mall also serves as a flagship mall and is considered by the mall's owners to be the "catalyst" for the "renaissance" of the Araneta City through its redevelopment master plan.

Features
The mall has 264 shops, with Rustan's as the primary anchor tenant and 57 restaurants and food stalls, and hosts primarily upscale, electronics, and fashion shops, such as Automatic Centre Digital Plaza, H&M, Uniqlo, Miniso, Samsung, Apple Store, Lacoste, Xiaomi, Robinsons Supermarket and other retail shops, restaurants, and dining outlets. The mall also hosted the Mandarin Oriental Suites and the Mandarin Oriental Café and Deli in 2005, however, both the hotel suites and the cafe and deli restaurant closed a few years later due to undisclosed reasons.

Gateway is also known for its emphasis on nature within its architectural design, featuring leaf-like interiors throughout the mall, and hallmarks a Fabergé egg-inspired glass pavilion located along General Aguinaldo Avenue. The pavilion is also surrounded by al-fresco dining choices named the Coliseum Circle, and connects the Araneta Coliseum through the mall's sidewalks and alleyways. The mall also features many amenities, such as an activity atrium; The Oasis, the first indoor, air-conditioned, open-roof garden in the country, open to diners and for reservations, capable of housing 70 people; The Gateway Gallery, an Art museum showcasing Philippine History; and The Topiary Garden, an open-air rooftop garden, both located at the 5th level. The 3rd level of the mall houses The Food Express food court, while the 4th level of the mall contains a 10-cinema cineplex, known as the Gateway Cineplex 10, which includes the 500-seater Cinema 5 and the Platinum Cinema which is touted by the mall owners as the "first La-Z-Boy theater" in the Philippines, before the opening of the SM Mall of Asia nearly two years later in 2006. The mall also once featured the Gateway Food Park, where public events were once held, and once served as an night food market, before the area was excavated to give way for the construction of the Ibis Styles Hotel and the New Gateway Mall (Gateway Mall 2).

Gateway is also directly connected to the lower six retail levels of the adjacent Gateway Tower, known as the Gateway Tower Mall. The expansion increased the mall's space with additional  of retail space, and was completed in 2013. The mall is also directly connected to the Farmers Plaza, and the Smart Araneta Coliseum previously via footbridge, giving direct access to the MRT 3 Cubao Station. Nowadays the footbridge is dismantled to give way for the Farmers Plaza-Gateway Mall 2 section of the New Gateway Mall. The mall is also connected to the upcoming New Gateway Mall and the Ibis Styles Araneta City, along with the New Frontier Theater and the Manhattan Parkview via elevated link bridge; the LRT 2 Cubao Station; and the 11-storey Gateway Office Building occupied by Accenture located adjacent to the LRT 2 Cubao Station Concourse.

In 2018, the Araneta Group announced its plans for the renovation of the Gateway Mall. The renovation plans for the mall will feature  new interior designs in some major parts of the mall.

New Gateway (Gateway Mall 2)

Planning, Construction and Development
The New Gateway (Gateway Mall 2) is an 8-storey topped-off expansion project of the Gateway Mall. Plans for the Gateway Mall 2 complex were laid out as early as 2014, while construction commenced in 2017 at a cost of ₱6.5 Billion, wherein the budget was divided into ₱5 billion for the New Gateway Mall, while ₱1.5 billion were used for the Ibis Styles Hotel. The new expansion of the mall stands at the former Gateway Food Park, the former Gateway-Farmers Plaza elevated walkway and an open lot parking space, located at the west side of the Smart Araneta Coliseum (Red Gate), giving easy and direct access to the Farmers Plaza, the Smart Araneta Coliseum, the MRT 3 Cubao Station and the upcoming Ibis Styles Araneta City, a 286-room economy hotel.

Gateway Mall 2 is a part of the Araneta Center Redevelopment Plan aimed to "redefine" the mall experience in the country. During the mall's planning and early construction phases, the first initial design of the mall featured a curved facade with 3D LED screens, which also included another activity atrium, and a 500-seater chapel. However, changes were made within the mall's facade and amenities during the later phases during the mall's topping off ceremony in 2020, as the mall's current design was utilized and a side spire was also planned to be placed within the mall's facade, but was turned down later on early 2022. The mall's construction began on the second quarter of 2017, where the foundations linking to the Farmers Plaza was constructed, and in August 2017, the former Gateway Food Park, as well as the former parking space located on the Coliseum's western Red Gate facade, were excavated to give way for the construction of the main building of the mall, while the official groundbreaking ceremony followed in July 2018. When completed, the development will have  of total retail space, with Megawide Construction Corporation serving as the general contractor of the project, while the Araneta Group tapped Aidea as the main architectural firm for both exterior and interior designs, Stages, Design and Construction (SDC) for finishing works, and AMCOM & Company Inc. as the general consultant of the project. The new mall is also set to comply with basic LEED development standards.

The New Gateway Mall is officially topped off on February 11, 2020, and is originally scheduled for completion in the 4th quarter of 2020, to commemorate the 60th anniversary opening of the Araneta Coliseum. However, due to the effects of the COVID-19 Pandemic in the country, the construction and opening of the mall, along with the adjacent Ibis Styles Hotel was delayed, and the construction cost of the entire complex grew from ₱6.5 billion to ₱7 billion, wherein ₱2 billion were allocated for the Ibis Styles Hotel. The new complex is expected to be completed and fully opened within the first half of 2023, after being moved twice from its original opening date within December 2022, and was initially moved on the first quarter of 2023.

Features

Designed to be an indoor oasis with contemporary architecture once completed, Gateway Mall 2 also features a nature-inspired design, featuring vertical fins within the mall's western and southern exteriors and a tree-inspired side crown within the mall's southwestern facade. The Gateway Mall 2 also attributes timber tree-like interiors and columns, and water features, such as The Lagoon, located at the ground floor of the Gourmet Hall. Gateway Mall 2 will contain additional 800 parking slots at the basement levels; a 3,500 m2 (38,000 sq ft) multi-level, "European Market" inspired Gourmet Hall; a  activity area atrium with ceiling LED screens, known as the Quantum Skyview and the "Palenque", a  food alley in association with Claude Tayag, a well known Filipino artist and chef, featuring various dishes in the country, both located within Upper Ground-B Level, after being relocated from the 4th floor; an Asian Village food hub for restaurants based within the Asia-Pacific region, occupying the 2nd floor; a K-Pop themed Cafe and a Bowling Center named Paeng's Gateway Bowl at the third floor, an island restaurant-themed food court; an 8-cinema cineplex located at the 4th floor; an organic vegetable garden and sensory garden, and a "Papal Hat" inspired church named the Sagrada Familia Church, both of which are located within the mall's fifth level. Named and inspired after the Sagrada Família in Barcelona, Spain, the church has 1,000 seats and features high ceilings and modern church glass windows emphasizing natural light.  

The new mall is set to house over 500 shops, including over 100 food and beverage shops and restaurants, and will also include retail, dining, nightlife, and leisure spaces, along with a supermarket, with Shopwise occupying the lower ground floor of the mall, as the supermarket transfers in a new location, occupying at least  of retail space in the mall. The area occupied by Shopwise will soon be redeveloped for the City Plaza, a 5-tower mixed-use complex consisting a 4-star hotel, retail spaces, premium grade offices, premium residential units, and green civic spaces. The new mall will soon also be connected to the nearby Gateway Mall 3 located at the Araneta City Cyberpark.

Parts of the new expansion, mostly concentrated in the connecting walkway to Farmers Plaza and the Coliseum grounds, were opened in February 2019, before a new walkway was completed in May 2022. The walkway was also occupied by various stalls, and in July 2022, the second walkway linking the mall to Farmers Plaza was opened, while shutting down restaurants located within the southwestern side of the Gateway Mall to give way for the walkways linking the Gateway to Gateway 2. The latest opening of the new Gateway Link was opened in the middle of December 2022, which opened the first direct walkways located in the upper ground level, and utilizing the former space occupied by Pizza Hut to serve as the new walkway for the mall, causing the former walkway passing through the Araneta Coliseum to be closed down and is set to be revamped into new mall spaces. Various restaurants are presently setting up furnishing works within the mall, such as Pizza Hut, Dairy Queen, Yoshinoya, Tong Yang Plus, and other restaurants.

The new Coliseum Red Gate entrance at the Ground Floor, as well as the Gateway Mall 2 exitway at the mall's Level UG-A opened on January 23, 2023, coinciding with Ne-Yo's Live in Concert Tour.

Planned expansion

Gateway Mall 3
The mall is currently on the conceptual stage, set to rise within the Telus House and will also occupy an open lot located behind the building, located at the Araneta City Cyberpark. The planned mall will also connect all 5 office towers of the Cyberpark and features an outdoor park, underground parking spaces, and additional eco-friendly initiatives.

Reception
Gateway Mall received critical acclaim from the retail and developer industries. The Philippine Retailers Association named the shopping mall as the Shopping Center of the Year twice, in 2006 and 2007. At the 30th Innovative Design and Development Awards of the International Council of Shopping Centers, the mall is a recipient of a Merit Award. It was also a finalist for the 2008 Urban Land Institute Awards for Excellence.

Gallery

References

External links
Gateway Mall

Shopping malls established in 2004
Shopping malls in Quezon City
Buildings and structures in Quezon City